The 1938 Arizona gubernatorial election took place on November 8, 1938. Incumbent Governor Rawghlie Clement Stanford declined to run for reelection, with pharmacy and cattle ranch owner Robert Taylor Jones winning the Democratic nomination to succeed Stanford.

Robert Taylor Jones defeated Jerrie W. Lee in the general election, and was sworn into his first and only term as Governor on January 2, 1939, becoming Arizona's sixth Governor.

Democratic primary
The Democratic primary took place on September 13, 1938. Incumbent Governor Rawghlie Clement Stanford, who had served only one term, declined to run for reelection amidst the Great Depression. Pharmacy and cattle ranch owner Robert Taylor Jones, Secretary of State James H. Kerby, former Secretary of State Sidney P. Osborn, Mayor Andrew Jackson Bettwy, and C. M. Zander ran to replace Stanford.

After losing the Democratic primary, James Kerby ran as an Independent Democrat in the general election, but received only token support, in the single digits.

Candidates
 Robert Taylor Jones, pharmacy owner, cattle rancher
 James H. Kerby, Secretary of State of Arizona
 Sidney P. Osborn, former Secretary of State of Arizona
 Andrew Jackson Bettwy, former Mayor of Nogales, Arizona
 C. M. Zander, Secretary of the Board of Directors of State Institutions

Results

Republican primary

Candidates
 Jerrie W. Lee, secretary of the Arizona Wool Growers Association

General election

References

1938
1938 United States gubernatorial elections
Gubernatorial
November 1938 events